The Pōrangahau River runs 45 km through southern Hawke's Bay in New Zealand.  The river winds through rugged hill country to the north of Cape Turnagain, reaching the Pacific Ocean close to the township of Porangahau.

Rivers of the Hawke's Bay Region
Rivers of New Zealand